View of Victoria Embankment in London (Dutch - Gezicht op Victoria Embankment in Londen) is an 1890 etching by the Dutch artist, etcher and photographer Willem Witsen. It shows a foggy autumnal scene on Victoria Embankment in London - he stayed in the city between 1888 and 1891 with only a few interruptions. He also produced prints of the scene in 1906 and 1908, one of which is in the Rijksmuseum.

External links
https://www.rijksmuseum.nl/en/collection/RP-P-OB-25.717

19th-century etchings
Prints of the Rijksmuseum Amsterdam
London in popular culture